Metrioptera brachyptera is a species in the family Tettigoniidae commonly called the bog bush cricket.

M. brachyptera has a body length of 12–16 mm, with color ranging from brownish, with green elements on the upper side of the head and forearm, as well as on the sides of the body. In the female, the hind legs are often partly weakly greenish. As the name suggests, The wings are usually brachypterous, although long-winged morphs may be found.

Its range extends to most of Europe, except the Iberian peninsula. It is typically found in bogs, marshes, and other wetlands. The males can be fairly aggressive and attract mates with a song consisting of a simple repeated "zirr".

Gallery

References

External links
 
 

Orthoptera of Europe
Tettigoniidae
Insects described in 1761
Taxa named by Carl Linnaeus